Rodney Anderson may refer to:
 Rodney Anderson (American football)
 Rodney Anderson (Wyoming politician)
 Rodney Anderson (Texas politician)
 Rod Anderson (writer) (Rodney J. Anderson), Canadian poet and musician

See also
 Rod Anderson, Australian racing driver